The 2017–18 Cypriot Second Division was the 63rd season of the Cypriot second-level football league. It began on 15 September 2017 and ended on 21 April 2018. Enosis Neon Paralimni won their third title.

Team changes from 2016–17

Teams promoted to 2017–18 Cypriot First Division
 Alki Oroklini
 Pafos FC
 Olympiakos Nicosia

Teams relegated from 2016–17 Cypriot First Division
 Karmiotissa
 Anagennisi Deryneia
 AEZ Zakakiou

Teams promoted from 2016–17 Cypriot Third Division
 P.O. Xylotymbou
 Digenis Oroklinis
 Chalkanoras Idaliou

Teams relegated to 2017–18 Cypriot Third Division
 Akritas Chlorakas
 ENAD Polis Chrysochous
 Enosis Neon Parekklisia

Stadia and locations

Note: Table lists clubs in alphabetical order.

League table

Results

References

Cypriot Second Division seasons
2017–18 in Cypriot football
Cyprus